The Central Hospital of Wuhan is a tertiary hospital located in Jiang'an District in Wuhan, Hubei, China. It was established in 1880 as a clinic under Hankou's Catholic church. In 1893, it was later expanded and renamed as Catholic Hospital.

On 15 December 2019, what would be the first documented COVID-19 patients were admitted here.

Notable staff
The hospital was where staff director of the emergency department, Ai Fen, and ophthalmologist Li Wenliang became aware of a viral outbreak that was later linked to the COVID-19 pandemic in China and beyond. Li later contracted the virus from a patient and died at the hospital on February 7, 2020.

References

External links
  

Hospitals in Wuhan
Wuhan Central Hospital
1880 establishments in China
Hospitals established in 1880
COVID-19 pandemic in mainland China